Luke Stephan Sassano (born October 14, 1985 in Orinda, California) is an American former soccer player.

Career

Youth and college
Sassano began his career at Lamorinda Soccer Club. He attended Miramonte High School in Orinda, California, and played college soccer at the University of California, Berkeley. He was an All-Pac-10 Honorable Mention in 2005, a Pac-10 All-Academic Honorable Mention in 2007, and a Pac-10 1st Team in 2007. Sassano featured in a total of 64 games scoring four goals and registering 19 assists during his four-year career for the Golden Bears. During his college years Sassano also played for USL Premier Development League sides San Francisco Seals and San Jose Frogs.

Professional
Sassano was drafted with the 32nd pick of the 2008 MLS SuperDraft by New York Red Bulls and made his debut on 5 April 2008 in a home game against Columbus Crew. He was a valuable member of the squad in 2008 as his versatility enabled him to receive significant playing time in his rookie campaign. With the injury to starting defensive midfielder Seth Stammler, Sassano was inserted into the starting lineup for the club's first round MLS Playoff series against the defending champion Houston Dynamo. Sassano's defensive play helped the club upset heavily favored Houston 4–1 on aggregate, helping the club reach the Western Conference Final.

During his second season, Sassano featured in 17 regular season games playing primarily as a defensive midfielder. Following the 2009 Major League Soccer season, Sassano went on a three-week training stint with sister club FC Red Bull Salzburg.

Sassano appeared in 3 matches in 2010 before having season-ending ankle reconstruction surgery. On December 15, 2010 Sassano was selected by Los Angeles Galaxy in Stage 2 of the Re-Entry draft and subsequently traded to Sporting Kansas City. He signed with Sporting KC on January 12, 2011. On June 12, 2011 he scored his first Major League Soccer goal in a 4–1 victory over FC Dallas. Sassano had season ending knee surgery on September 28, 2011. He re-signed with SKC on January 30, 2012. Sassano started off 2012 in promising fashion before being sidelined with his third extensive surgery in 2 years.

Post-professional
After multiple injuries, including two knee surgeries in 2012, Sassano chose to retire as a professional soccer player, but he wished to remain involved in the sport. On April 16, 2013, Sassano was named Assistant Sporting Director for the New York Cosmos. Along with scouting for talent both domestically and internationally, he is responsible for negotiating contracts and managing the roster.

On March 14, 2018, Sassano was named the technical director of FC Cincinnati during their final season in the United Soccer League. He was heavily involved with the planning and roster selection for FC Cincinnati as they moved up to Major League Soccer.

Career statistics

Honors

New York Red Bulls
Major League Soccer Western Conference Championship (1): 2008

References

External links
 
 Cal Bears bio

1985 births
Living people
American soccer players
California Golden Bears men's soccer players
San Francisco Seals (soccer) players
San Jose Frogs players
New York Red Bulls players
Sporting Kansas City players
Sportspeople from the San Francisco Bay Area
North Carolina FC players
USL League Two players
Major League Soccer players
Miramonte High School alumni
North American Soccer League players
People from Orinda, California
New York Red Bulls draft picks
Soccer players from California
Association football defenders
FC Cincinnati non-playing staff
Association football midfielders